August Adler (24 January 1863, Opava, Austrian Silesia – 17 October 1923, Vienna) was a Czech and Austrian mathematician noted for using the theory of inversion to provide an alternate proof of Mascheroni's compass and straightedge construction theorem.

External links 
 

1863 births
1923 deaths
People from Opava
People from Austrian Silesia
Geometers
19th-century Austrian mathematicians
Czechoslovak mathematicians